David Švehlík (born 6 April 1972 in Liberec) is a Czech actor.

He starred in many Czech movies (including Operace Silver A under director Jiří Strach in 2007) and TV series (Kriminálka Anděl etc.)

His father Alois Švehlík is also an actor.

References

1972 births
Living people
Actors from Liberec
Czech male film actors
Czech male stage actors
Czech male television actors
Academy of Performing Arts in Prague alumni